Save percentage (often known by such symbols as SV%, SVS%, SVP, PCT) is a statistic in various goal-scoring sports that track saves as a statistic.

In ice hockey and lacrosse, it is a statistic that represents the percentage of shots on goal a goaltender stops. It is calculated by dividing the number of saves by the total number of shots on goal.

Although the statistic is called a "percentage", it is often given as a decimal, in the same way as a batting average in baseball. Thus, .933 means a goaltender saved 93.3 percent of all shots they faced. In international ice hockey, a save percentage is expressed as a true percentage, such as 90%.

National Hockey League (NHL) goaltenders typically have a save percentage above .900, and National Lacrosse League (NLL) goaltenders typically have a save percentage above .750.

See also
Goals against average, a statistic that represents the number of goals allowed per game by a goaltender

Percentages
Ice hockey statistics